Olivo Barbieri (born 1954 in Carpi, Emilia-Romagna) is an Italian artist and photographer of urban environments.

He is recognized for his innovative technique creating miniature still photography from actual landscapes by simulating shallow depth of field via the use of tilt-shift lens photography. Barbieri's technique simulates the shallow depth of field effect of macro photography by tilting the lens's angle to the back plane of the camera, which creates a gradual blurring at the top and bottom edges, or left and right edges of the filmed image. The technique is called selected focus and the effect is that a picture of an actual city looks like the picture of a model.

Career
Barbieri began his career in photography studying at DAMS (Drama, Art and Music Studies) at the Faculty of Arts and Humanities of the University of Bologna. After 1971, his interest in photography grew and, initially, he focused his research on artificial lighting. In 1978, he took part in several exhibitions in Italy and also abroad. In 1989 he started to travel regularly to the Far East, particularly to China.

In 1993, 1995 and 1997 Barbieri exhibited his work at the Venice Biennale, among other international exhibitions, and in galleries and museums throughout Europe, North America, and China. In 1996, the Museum Folkwang in Essen, Germany, devoted a retrospective to his work, which has been collected by museums worldwide. In 1998 and 1999, his work was featured in two exhibitions at the Canadian Centre for Architecture in Montreal.

In 2003 Barbieri started the Site Specific project (photos and films) describing cities like Rome, Turin, Montreal, Amman, Las Vegas, Los Angeles, Shanghai, Siviglia, New York and others. He has realised several 35mm films within this project:
site specific_ROMA 04
site specific_SHANGHAI 04
site specific_LAS VEGAS 05
SEVILLA → (∞) 06
site specific_MODENA 08

Site specific_ROMA 04 was exhibited in 2005 at Museum of Contemporary Art, Chicago, at the Hayward Gallery of London and at Museo di arte moderna e contemporanea di Trento e Rovereto (MART).

Films
In 2005 he also started two series of movies called Seascape# and Riverscape#, which include:
Seascape#1 Night, China Shenzhen, 05
Seascape#2 Castel dell’Ovo, Napoli, 06
Rivescape#1, Night, China Shanghai 2007

Other movies realised by Barbieri are:
Beijing Sky, 2007
5 Colori, 2008
TWIY, 2008
Tuscany in 6 pieces, 2010

Barbieri's films have been presented in the most important international festivals, including:
Locarno Film Festival 2004,2005, 2008;
International Film Festival Rotterdam 2004, 2006;
Medien und architectktur Biennale Graz 2005–2007;
Toronto International Film Festival 2005, 2006;
Wexner Center for the Arts, Columbus, Ohio 2006;
New York Film Festival 2006;
Sundance Film Festival 2006, 2008;
San Francisco International Film Festival 2006, 2007;
Berkeley Art Museum and Pacific Film Archive, Berkeley 2006, 2007;
Walker Art Center, Minneapolis 2007;
MoMA, New York 2007;
Jeu De Paume, Paris 2007;
Tate Modern, London 2007;
Berlin Film Festival 2007.

Personal
He lives and works in Milan.

Books
Several books and catalogues have been published on Barbieri's work, including:
Paesaggi in Miniatura, Udine 1991
Notte, Udine 1991
Olivo Barbieri seit 1978, Museum Folgwan, Essen 1996
Illuminazioni Artificiali, Milan 1995, Washington, D.C. 1998
Notsofareast, Rome 2002
Paintings, Florence 2002
site Specific_Roma 04, Rome 2004
site Specific_Las Vegas 05, Toronto 2005
site specific_SHANGHAI 04, Bologna 2006
site specific_NYC 07, Carpi 2007
TWIY, Napoli 2008
site specific_JORDAN 04, Genova 2008
The Waterfall Project, Bologna 2008
site specific_BEIJING 08, Alcamo 2008
 Site Specific, New York: Aperture, September 2013.

Awards
Barbieri has won several awards and prizes for his work:
2008 SEVILLA → (∞) 06, Nashville Film Festival, Best Experimental Short
2006 site specific_LAS VEGAS, San Francisco Film Festival, New Visions
2006 site specific_ROMA 04, Median und Arkitecture Biennale, Graz, Austria
1992 Higashikawa Award, Japan, The Overseas Photographer Prize
1990 Premio Friuli Venezia Giulia Fotografia, Italy

References

External links 
 Personal site

1954 births
Living people
Artists from Carpi, Emilia-Romagna
Italian photographers
Italian contemporary artists
Aerial photographers